Dyess Army Airfield (also known as Freeflight International Airport) is a military airfield on Roi-Namur, Kwajalein Atoll, Marshall Islands. It is owned by the United States Army. Approximately 60 U.S. personnel reside on the base, with an additional 100 personnel commuting from Bucholz Army Airfield daily by plane.

History

When the Japanese took control of the island during World War II they built an airfield that took the form of the number "4."  After the 4th Marine Division landed the Seabees of 3rd Battalion, 20th Marines and the 109th Naval Construction Battalion made the field operational again. The Japanese designated the runways A, B, and C, with A being the vertical leg, B being the diagonal and C intersecting at a right angle to A.  The Seabees of the Naval Base Kwajalein repaired runways A and C.  Today the only runway that remains is A.

On September 19, 1950, the Marshall Islands' worst aviation accident happened near Dyess. A Douglas R5D-3 (56496) of the US Navy crashed into the Pacific shortly after takeoff from runway 07 on what was supposed to be a flight to Tokyo, killing all 26 onboard.

Facilities 
Dyess Army Airfield is at an elevation of 10 feet (3 m) above mean sea level. The runway is designated 04/22 with an asphalt surface measuring 4,499 by 150 feet (1,371 x 45.5 m).

References

External links 
 

Airports in the Marshall Islands
Kwajalein Atoll
United States Army airfields